Hua Ro is a subdistrict in the Mueang Phitsanulok District of Phitsanulok Province, Thailand. In 2019 it had a population of 24,902 and 12,690 households. This subdistrict contains a concentration of regional and provincial government institutions.

Geography
The topography of Hua Ro is fertile lowlands.  The subdistrict is bordered to the northwest by Pak Thok subdistrict, to the north by Makham Sung subdistrict and Ban Pa subdistrict, to the east by Don Thong subdistrict and Samo Khae subdistrict, to the south by Aranyik subdistrict and the City of Phitsanulok, and to the west by Phlai Chumphon subdistrict and Ban Khlong subdistrict. Hua Ro subdistrict lies in the Nan Basin, which is part of the Chao Phraya Watershed.  The Nan River flows west of the subdistrict. Northern part of Hua Ro subdistrict is the area of agriculture and housing, southern part of Hua Ro subdistrict is a residential area for people and a cluster of government institutions and schools.

History
Originally, the area was combined with Phlai Chumphon subdistrict, called Wat Tan subdistrict. It was separated into two subdistricts, with the Nan river as a dividing line. The area on the westside was called Phlai Chumphon subdistrict and the area on the eastside was called Hua Ro subdistrict.Hua Ro Subdistrict Administrative Organization - SAO (ongkan borihan suan tambon) was established. Subsequent upgrade to subdistrict-municipality (thesaban tambon), published 20 September 2011 in Royal Thai Government Gazette, but effective 30 September 2011.

Administration
The administration of Hua Ro municipality is responsible for an area that covers 88.8 km2 and consists of 12 administrative villages, as of 2019: 24,902 people and 12,690 households.

Administrative villages contain many villages such as:
 Moo3 - Mae Thorani Thong, Athor and Lovely Home
 Moo5 - Thip Phiman
 Moo6 - Fa Sai, Sophon, Ratchathani Housing, Rom Chat 2 and Sawan Pin Kaew
 Moo7 - Sawan Fah Ing Dao and Parisorn
 Moo8 - Dwongchai and Nuchada Park
 Moo11- Choti Park

Temples
Hua Ro subdistrict is home to the following active temples, where Theravada Buddhism is practiced by local residents:

Economy
Employment is as follows: agriculture 50%, civil servant/state enterprise 25%, private agency 10%, personal business 10% and general contractor 5%. In addition to the many government organizations in Ban Ta Pa Khao Hai (Moo4) and Ban Khlong (Moo5), in Ban Sa Khlo (Moo7) there is Thai Arrow Company a medium sized enterprise (33,000 m2) with their own shuttle touring car busses to pick up the mostly female workers. There are three fresh markets: Hua Ro municipality fresh market, Wat Photiyan intersection fresh market and Thai Theng Nam village fresh market.

Government institutions
The following regional, provincial and local government institutions are mainly situated in Ban Ta Pa Khao Hai (Moo4) and Ban Khlong (Moo5):

 Land Development Office 8
 Regional Office of Agricultural Economics 2
 Regional Office of Attorney General
 Regional Medical Sciences Center 2 (Phitsanulok)
 National Broadcasting Services of Thailand (NBTTV) This TV station in Hua Ro has been broadcasting to seven provinces since 1971.
 Phitsanulok Area Revenue Office 7
 Police Forensic Center 6, responsibility area of 10 provinces
 Phitsanulok Immigration Office
 Provincial Waterworks Authority Regional Office 10, responsible for the service in 10 provinces
 Public Relations Office Region 4 Phitsanulok, Office of the Prime Minister
 Department of Juvenile Observation and Protection
 Provincial Juvenile and Family Court
 Center for Control of Contagious Disease (CDC)
 Phitsanulok Provincial Audit Office
 Phitsanulok Provincial Fisheries Office
 Phitsanulok Provincial Legal Execution Office
 Tourist Police Station

Waterworks
Provincial Waterworks Authority (PWA) supplied tap water to 9,727 households or 77%. The conclusion is: 23% of the households (2,963) did not use tap water.

Healthcare
There are Hua Ro health-promoting hospital in Ban Ta Pa Khao Hai (Moo4) andBan Sa Khlo health-promoting hospital in Ban Sa Khlo (Moo10).

Education

 Triam Udom Suksa school of the North, upper secondary school - mathayom 4-6
 Anuban primary school
 Wat Maha Wanaram primary school
 Wat Photiyan primary school
 Wat Sa Khlo primary school
 Wat Ta Pa Khao primary school

Sports
Phitsanulok PAO. Stadium in Ban Khlong (Moo5) with 3,000 seats is the home stadium for footballclub Phitsanulok United.

References

Tambon of Phitsanulok province
Populated places in Phitsanulok province